Aves Argentinas / Asociación Ornitológica del Plata (in English: Argentine Birds), is an Argentine non-profit environmental organization dedicated to conservation and birdwatching. Created in 1916, it is the oldest environmental organization in South America.

The organization is involved in the re-introduction of the red-and-green macaw (Ara chloropterus) which has not  been recorded in Argentina for some years. It is listed as critically endangered in Argentina, and listed as a ″a species of global least concern″ on the IUCN Red List. The first birds were released  in 2015, in the Iberá Provincial Reserve (Spanish: Reserva Provincial Iberá) in north-eastern province of Corrientes

References

External links
 Aves Argentinas
 BirdLife International

1916 establishments in Argentina
Bird conservation organizations
Environmental organisations based in Argentina
Ornithological organizations
Organizations established in 1916
Animal welfare organisations based in Argentina